Púchov District is a district in the Trenčín Region of western Slovakia. Until 1918, the district was part of the county of Kingdom of Hungary of Trencsén. It belongs to Upper Váh region of tourism.

Municipalities
Beluša
Dohňany
Dolná Breznica
Dolné Kočkovce
Horná Breznica
Horovce
Kvašov
Lazy pod Makytou
Lednica
Lednické Rovne
Lúky
Lysá pod Makytou
Mestečko
Mojtín
Nimnica
Púchov
Streženice
Visolaje
Vydrná
Záriečie
Zubák

Districts of Slovakia
Trenčín Region